Boie's day gecko (Cnemaspis boiei) is a species of lizard in the family Gekkonidae. The species is endemic to India.

Etymology
C. boiei is named after Friedrich Boie (1789–1870) or his brother Heinrich Boie (1794–1827), German naturalists.

Description
C. boiei may attain a snout-to-vent length (SVL) of almost .

Reproduction
C. boiei is oviparous.

References

Further reading
Boulenger GA (1885). Catalogue of the Lizards in the British Museum (Natural History). Second Edition. Volume I. Geckonidæ, Eublepharidæ, Uroplatidæ, Pygopodidæ, Agamidæ. London: Trustees of the British Museum (Natural History). (Taylor and Francis, printers). xii + 436 pp. ("Gonatodes boiei [sic]", new combination, p. 72).
Gray JE (1842). "Description of some new species of Reptiles, chiefly from the British Museum collection". The Zoological Miscellany 2: 57–59. ("Goniodactylus Boeï [sic]", new species, p. 58).
Rösler H (2000). "Kommentierte Liste der rezent, subrezent und fossil bekannten Geckotaxa (Reptilia: Gekkonomorpha)". Gekkota 2: 28–153. ("Cnemaspis boei [sic]", p. 62). (in German).
Smith MA (1935). The Fauna of British India, Including Ceylon and Burma. Reptilia and Amphibia. Vol. II.—Sauria. London: Secretary of State for India in Council. (Taylor and Francis, printers). xiii + 440 pp. + Plate I + 2 maps. ("Cnemaspis boiei [sic]", new combination, p. 75).

Cnemaspis
Reptiles described in 1842
Taxa named by John Edward Gray